Viktor Petrovich Antikhovich (5 April 1945 – 20 December 2021) was a Russian professional football coach and a player. He died on 20 December 2021, at the age of 76.

References

External links
 

1945 births
2021 deaths
People from Engels, Saratov Oblast
Soviet footballers
Association football midfielders
PFC Krylia Sovetov Samara players
FC SKA Rostov-on-Don players
FC Rubin Kazan players
Soviet football managers
Russian football managers
PFC Krylia Sovetov Samara managers
FC Lada-Tolyatti managers
FC Zhemchuzhina Sochi managers
FC Rubin Kazan managers
FC Luch Vladivostok managers
Russian Premier League managers
Sportspeople from Saratov Oblast